Gerard Joseph O'Flaherty (born August 31, 1950) is a Canadian-American retired professional ice hockey player. During a playing career that lasted from 1971 to 1979 he played for the Toronto Maple Leafs, Vancouver Canucks, and Atlanta Flames of the National Hockey League, as well as time with the Tulsa Oilers of the minor Central Hockey League. Internationally O'Flaherty played for the United States at the inaugural 1976 Canada Cup.

Playing career
Born in Pittsburgh, Pennsylvania where his father, John "Peanuts" O'Flaherty, played for the Pittsburgh Hornets, O'Flaherty later moved to Toronto, Ontario where he played in the MTHL with the North York Rangers. He was selected by the Toronto Maple Leafs in the 1970 NHL Amateur Draft and played a single year there before being claimed by the Vancouver Canucks during the Intra-League Draft. While serving the Canucks O'Flaherty registered three consecutive 20-goal seasons and appeared in a total of 438 regular season games in 1971–1979. When he scored 25 goals in 1974-75, it was the most in a season by an American-born player, breaking the previous mark of 23, set by Tom Williams, in 1962-63. O'Flaherty's record was broken in 1978-79 when Tom Rowe scored 31 goals for the Washington Capitals.

International play
O'Flaherty played for the United States at the inaugural 1976 Canada Cup. He had one assist in four games.

Career statistics

Regular season and playoffs

International

References

External links

Gerry O'Flaherty at Hockeydraftcentral.com

1950 births
Living people
American men's ice hockey right wingers
Atlanta Flames players
Canadian ice hockey right wingers
American emigrants to Canada
Ice hockey people from Pennsylvania
Kitchener Rangers players
Montreal Canadiens scouts
Nova Scotia Voyageurs players
Sportspeople from Pittsburgh
Ice hockey people from Toronto
Tampa Bay Lightning scouts
Toronto Maple Leafs draft picks
Toronto Maple Leafs players
Vancouver Canucks players
Ice hockey people from Pittsburgh